This article charts the history of Motherwell F.C. from their foundation in 1886 to the end of the Second World War.

1886-1887
Manager: Committee

Scottish Cup
First Qualifying Round

1887-1888
Manager: Committee

Scottish Cup
First Qualifying Round

Second Qualifying Round

1888-1889
Manager: Committee

Scottish Cup
First Qualifying Round

Replay

Second Qualifying Round

Third Qualifying Round

1889-1890
Manager: Committee

Scottish Cup
First Qualifying Round

Second Qualifying Round

1890-1891
Manager: Committee

Scottish Cup
First Qualifying Round

1891-1892
Manager: Committee

Scottish Football Federation

Scottish Cup
First Qualifying Round

1892-1893
Manager: Committee

Scottish Football Federation

Scottish Cup
First Qualifying Round

Replay – The game was replayed after Campsie complained about the dimensions of the pitch.

Second Qualifying Round

Other Honours
Lanarkshire Express Cup winners
Airdrie Charity Cup winners

1893-1894
Manager: Committee

Scottish Second Division

Scottish Cup

1894-1895
Manager: Committee

Scottish Second Division

Scottish Cup

Other Honours
Lanarkshire Cup winners

1895-1896
Manager: Committee

Scottish Second Division

Scottish Cup

1896-1897
Manager: Committee

Scottish Second Division

Scottish Cup

1897-1898
Manager: Committee

Scottish Second Division

Scottish Cup

1898-1899
Manager: Committee

Scottish Second Division

Scottish Cup

Other Honours
Lanarkshire Cup winners

1899-1900
Manager: Committee

Scottish Second Division

Scottish Cup

1900-1901
Manager: Committee

Scottish Second Division

Scottish Cup

Other Honours
Lanarkshire Cup winners

1901-1902
Manager: Committee

Scottish Second Division

Scottish Cup

1902-1903
Manager: Committee

Scottish Second Division

Scottish Cup

1903-1904
Manager: Committee

Scottish First Division

Scottish Cup

1904–05
Manager: Committee

Scottish First Division

Scottish Cup

1905-1906
Manager: Committee

Scottish First Division

Scottish Cup

1906-1907
Manager: Committee

Scottish First Division

Scottish Cup

Other Honours
Lanarkshire Cup winners

1907-1908
Manager: Committee

Scottish First Division

Scottish Cup

1908-1909
Manager: Committee

Scottish First Division

Scottish Cup

1909-1910
Manager: Committee

Scottish First Division

Scottish Cup

1910-1911
Manager: Committee

Scottish First Division

Scottish Cup

1911-1912
Manager: John 'Sailor' Hunter, appointed April 1911.

Scottish First Division

Scottish Cup

Other Honours
Lanarkshire Cup winners

1912-1913
Manager: John 'Sailor' Hunter

Scottish First Division

Scottish Cup

1913-1914
Manager: John 'Sailor' Hunter

Scottish First Division

Scottish Cup

1914-1915
Manager: John 'Sailor' Hunter

Scottish First Division

Scottish Cup

Other Honours
Lanarkshire Express Cup winners

1915-1916
Manager: John 'Sailor' Hunter

Scottish First Division

Scottish Cup

1916-1917
Manager: John 'Sailor' Hunter

Scottish First Division

Scottish Cup

1917-1918
Manager: John 'Sailor' Hunter

Scottish First Division

Scottish Cup

Other Honours
Lanarkshire Charity Cup winners
Motherwell Charity Cup winners

1918-1919
Manager: John 'Sailor' Hunter

Scottish First Division

Scottish Cup

1919-1920
Manager: John 'Sailor' Hunter

Scottish First Division

Scottish Cup

1920-1921
Manager: John 'Sailor' Hunter

Scottish First Division

Scottish Cup

Other Honours
Lanarkshire Express Cup winners

1921-1922
Manager: John 'Sailor' Hunter

Scottish First Division

Scottish Cup

1922-1923
Manager: John 'Sailor' Hunter

Scottish First Division

Scottish Cup

1923-1924
Manager: John 'Sailor' Hunter

Scottish First Division

Scottish Cup

1924-1925
Manager: John 'Sailor' Hunter

Scottish First Division

Scottish Cup

Other Honours
Lanarkshire Express Cup winners

1925-1926
Manager: John 'Sailor' Hunter

Scottish First Division

Scottish Cup

Other Honours
Lanarkshire Express Cup winners

1926-1927
Manager: John 'Sailor' Hunter

Scottish First Division

Scottish Cup

Other Honours
Lanarkshire Cup winners

1927-1928
Manager: John 'Sailor' Hunter

Scottish First Division

Scottish Cup

Other Honours
Lanarkshire Cup winners

1928-1929
Manager: John 'Sailor' Hunter

Scottish First Division

Scottish Cup

Other Honours
Lanarkshire Cup winners

1929-1930
Manager: John 'Sailor' Hunter

Scottish First Division

Scottish Cup

Other Honours
Lanarkshire Cup winners

1930-1931
Manager: John 'Sailor' Hunter

Scottish First Division

Scottish Cup

1931-1932
Manager: John 'Sailor' Hunter

Scottish First Division

Scottish Cup

Other Honours
Lanarkshire Cup winners

1932-1933
Manager: John 'Sailor' Hunter

Scottish First Division

Scottish Cup

1933-1934
Manager: John 'Sailor' Hunter

Scottish First Division

Scottish Cup

1934-1935
Manager: John 'Sailor' Hunter

Scottish First Division

Scottish Cup

1935-1936
Manager: John 'Sailor' Hunter

Scottish First Division

Scottish Cup

1936-1937
Manager: John 'Sailor' Hunter

Scottish First Division

Scottish Cup

1937-1938
Manager: John 'Sailor' Hunter

Scottish First Division

Scottish Cup

1938-1939
Manager: John 'Sailor' Hunter

Scottish First Division

Scottish Cup

1939-1940
Manager: John 'Sailor' Hunter

Scottish First Division
(cancelled due to World War II)

League was suspended on 2 September 1939.  Britain declared war the following day. The team participated in the 1939–40 Scottish War Emergency League.

Scottish Cup
Suspended due to the outbreak of World War II, Scottish War Emergency Cup replaced it; Motherwell reached the Semi–finals.

Other Honours
Lanarkshire Cup winners

1940-1941
Manager: John 'Sailor' Hunter

Southern League

Southern League Cup

Summer Cup
First Round

Dumbarton win 5–2 on aggregate

1941-1942
Manager: John 'Sailor' Hunter

Southern League

Southern League Cup

Summer Cup
First Round

Motherwell win 4–3 on aggregate

Second Round

Motherwell win 4–2 on aggregate

Semi–final

1942-1943
Manager: John 'Sailor' Hunter

Southern League

Southern League Cup

Summer Cup
First Round

Celtic win 5–4 on aggregate

1943-1944
Manager: John 'Sailor' Hunter

Southern League

Southern League Cup

Summer Cup
First Round

Motherwell win 9–2 on aggregate

Second Round

Motherwell win 7–2 on aggregate

Semi–final

Final

1944-1945
Manager: John 'Sailor' Hunter

Southern League

Southern League Cup

Summer Cup

1945-1946
Manager: John 'Sailor' Hunter

Southern League

Southern League Cup

Victory Cup

References

External links
Scottish Football History website

Publications
Graham Barnstaple and Keith Brown (2004). "'Well Again! The Official History of Motherwell Football Club 1886-2004". Yore Publications. 
Alex Smith (2003). "Motherwell: Champions of Scotland 1931-32". Desert Island Books. 

Motherwell F.C.
Motherwell